873 Mechthild (prov. designation:  or ) is a dark background asteroid from the central regions of the asteroid belt. It was discovered by German astronomer Max Wolf at the Heidelberg Observatory on 21 May 1917. The origin of the asteroid's name remains unknown.

Orbit and classification 

Mechthild is a non-family asteroid of the main belt's background population when applying the hierarchical clustering method to its proper orbital elements. It orbits the Sun in the central asteroid belt at a distance of 2.2–3.0 AU once every 4 years and 3 months (1,555 days; semi-major axis of 2.63 AU). Its orbit has an eccentricity of 0.15 and an inclination of 5° with respect to the ecliptic. The body's observation arc begins with its first and official discovery observation at Heidelberg Observatory on 21 May 1917.

Naming 

This minor planet is named "Mechthild", a German feminine given name. Any reference of this name to a specific person or occurrence is unknown.

Unknown meaning 

Among the many thousands of named minor planets, Mechthild is one of 120 asteroids, for which no official naming citation has been published.

Physical characteristics 

In the Tholen classification, Mechthild is closest to a very dark, primitive P-type, and somewhat similar to a common C-type asteroid. In the taxonomy by Barucci, it is a C0-type. P-type asteroids are more common in the outer asteroid belt and among the Jupiter trojan population.

Rotation period 

In May 2015, a rotational lightcurve of Mechthild was obtained from photometric observations by Brian Warner at his Palmer Divide Observatory  in Colorado. Lightcurve analysis gave a rotation period of  hours with a brightness amplitude of  magnitude.

Alternative period determinations were made by Claes-Ingvar Lagerkvist in March 1976, by astronomers at the Palomar Transient Factory in January 2014, and by the Spanish group of asteroid observers, OBAS in May 2015. In 2016, a modeled lightcurve gave a concurring sidereal period of  hours using data from a large collaboration of individual observers (such as above). The study also determined two spin axes of (249.0°, −52.0°) and (51.0°, −61.0°) in ecliptic coordinates (λ, β).

Diameter and albedo 

The Collaborative Asteroid Lightcurve Link adopts the results from IRAS, that is, an albedo of 0.0531 and a diameter of 29.04 kilometers based on an absolute magnitude of 11.49.

References

External links 
 Lightcurve Database Query (LCDB), at www.minorplanet.info
 Dictionary of Minor Planet Names, Google books
 Discovery Circumstances: Numbered Minor Planets (1)-(5000) – Minor Planet Center
 
 

000873
Discoveries by Max Wolf
Named minor planets
000873
19170521